Tsuga sieboldii, also called the southern Japanese hemlock, or in Japanese, simply tsuga (栂), is a conifer native to the Japanese islands of Honshū, Kyūshū, Shikoku and Yakushima. In Europe and North America the tree is sometimes used as an ornamental and has been in cultivation since 1861.

Description
The tree is often multiple-stemmed from the base and the dense crown is broadly conical and pointed. The bark is a dark pink-grey in colour. It is smooth with horizontal folds when the tree is young, but later cracks into squares and become flaky. The glabrous shoots are a pale shining buff, but they may vary to white or pale brown. The base of the petiole is red-brown. The leaves are densely set in irregular flat rows. They are blunt with notched tips and shiny dark green above. The underside of the leaves has two broad, dull white stomatal bands. The buds are narrow based and ovoid, dark orange in colour. Their scales are convex.

The staminate (i.e. male) flowers are terminal on weak shoots. They are very small at only , globular in shape and cherry-red in colour. The deep dark brown cones are pendulous and ovoid-conic in shape. Their scales are flat topped.

References

sieboldii
Trees of Japan
Endemic flora of Japan
Taxa named by Élie-Abel Carrière